Redbourne is a village and civil parish in the North Lincolnshire district of Lincolnshire, England. According to the 2001 Census Redbourne had a population of 386, rising slightly to 400 at the 2011 census.

The name Redbourne is derived from the Old English Name "Hredburna" meaning "reedy burn", a reference to a stream running through the village.

The parish church of St Andrew was made redundant from the Church of England in 1978 and is now maintained by The Churches Conservation Trust. It is a Grade I listed building. Although the church has 14th- and 15th-century origins, the bulk of the existing building is 18th-century and represents a Georgian Gothic style, using a mixture of squared and coursed rubble limestone with ashlar dressings. The alterations of 1772–4 in the gothic style were by the Lincoln architects Thomas and Henry Lumby and the chapel on the south side of the chancel served as a mausoleum for the family of the Dukes of St Albans.

The Red Lion Hotel coaching inn on the village green dates from the 17th century.

A conservation area was designated in August 1985 by the old Humberside County Council and covers the historic village core but excludes the more recent residential developments on the periphery.

References

External links

Villages in the Borough of North Lincolnshire
Civil parishes in Lincolnshire